The Cinque Ports Light Railway was a scheme to build an electric tramway from Ramsgate to Hastings via Dover.

History
In the 1880s the South Eastern Railway appointed Sir Alexander Rose Stenning, a commercial architect who later became president of the Royal Institution of Chartered Surveyors, to examine various development opportunities for the railway.  These included proposals for the Cinque Port's Light Railway. It is likely that, had it been built, the gauge would have been 3 ft 6 in, allowing it to run through the Isle of Thanet Electric Tramways and Dover Corporation Tramways.

In 1871, a proposal to run a tramway between Dover and Ramsgate was refused by the Board of Trade. A similar proposal in 1872, to operate between Dover and Margate, was given official go-ahead but failed to raise sufficient finance.

The scheme had developed sufficiently by 1899 that a Mr. Parker had been appointed as resident engineer  and plans were presented to Hastings Borough Council in November 1899. The scheme floundered because of opposition from the people of Dover.

A.R. Stenning was also the surveyor for the Guilford Tramway, and it is possible that the intention was to incorporate that tramway into the overall route of the Cinque Ports Light Railway as the Guilford Tramway was built to this gauge.

See also 
 Cinque ports

References

External links 
Margate Museum Factsheet: The Isle of Thanet Tramway System 1901–1937

Rail transport in Kent
Rail transport in East Sussex